Laura Miller may refer to:
Laura Miller (politician), mayor of Dallas, Texas
Laura Miller (anthropologist) (born 1953), American anthropologist who specialises in linguistic anthropology and Japan studies
Laura Miller (Matlock), a character in the TV series Matlock
Laura Miller (journalist) (born 1980), broadcast journalist in Scotland
Laura Miller (writer), author, journalist and co-founder of Salon.com
Laura Miller (footballer) (born 2001), Luxembourger footballer
Laura Miller (mathematical biologist), American professor of mathematics
Laura Marie Miller, the birth name of the activist better known as Rosebud Abigail Denovo